In computational complexity theory and computability theory, a counting problem is a type of computational problem. If R is a search problem then 

is the corresponding counting function and

denotes the corresponding decision problem. 

Note that cR is a search problem while #R is a decision problem, however cR can be C Cook-reduced to #R (for appropriate C) using a binary search (the reason #R is defined the way it is, rather than being the graph of cR, is to make this binary search possible).

Counting complexity class
If NX is a complexity class associated with non-deterministic machines then #X = {#R | R ∈ NX} is the set of counting problems associated with each search problem in NX. In particular, #P is the class of counting problems associated with NP search problems.
Just as NP has NP-complete problems via many-one reductions, #P has complete problems via parsimonious reductions, problem transformations that preserve the number of solutions.

See also  
 GapP

External links
 
 

Computational problems